Novosad is a village and municipality in the Trebišov District in the Košice Region of south-eastern Slovakia.

History
In historical records the village was first mentioned in 1318.

Geography
The village lies at an altitude of 123 metres and covers an area of 15.256 km².
It has a population of about 1040 people.

Ethnicity
The village is about 97% Slovak.

Facilities
The village has a public library and a soccer pitch.

References

External links
https://web.archive.org/web/20110226112651/http://app.statistics.sk/mosmis/eng/run.html

Villages and municipalities in Trebišov District
Zemplín (region)